Chen Zhao (born 26 October 1996) is a Chinese professional footballer who currently plays for China League One club Shijiazhuang Gongfu, on loan from Chongqing Liangjiang Athletic.

Club career
Chen Zhao would play for the various Shanghai Luckystar youth teams before going abroad to continue his development. On 4 July 2017 he would return to China to sign for top-tier club Shanghai Shenhua and was immediately included in their first team squad. On 1 May 2019 Chen made his debut for the club in a Chinese FA Cup game away to Shenzhen F.C. that Shenhua won. Chen would then make his league debut against Shenzhen F.C. once again in a away match on 5 May 2019 in a 2–1 defeat.

Career statistics

Honours

Club
Shanghai Shenhua
Chinese FA Cup: 2019

References

External links

1996 births
Living people
Chinese footballers
Chinese expatriate footballers
Association football goalkeepers
Chinese Super League players
China League Two players
Atlético Madrid footballers
Shanghai Shenhua F.C. players
Qingdao Hainiu F.C. (1990) players
Chinese expatriate sportspeople in Spain
Expatriate footballers in Spain